The 2019 Camping World Bowl was a college football bowl game played on December 28, 2019, with kickoff at 12:00 p.m. EST on ABC. It was the 30th edition of the Camping World Bowl, and was one of the 2019–20 bowl games concluding the 2019 FBS football season. The game was sponsored by recreational vehicle company Camping World.

Teams
The game matched the Notre Dame Fighting Irish, an FBS independent and the Iowa State Cyclones from the Big 12 Conference. This was the first meeting between the two programs.

Notre Dame Fighting Irish

Notre Dame entered the game with a 10–2 record, ranked 14th in the AP Poll. The Fighting Irish split their four games against ranked teams, defeating Virginia and Navy while losing to Georgia and Michigan. This was Notre Dame's second Camping World Bowl; their 2011 team appeared in the then-Champs Sports Bowl, losing to Florida State, 18–14.

Iowa State Cyclones

Iowa State entered the game with a 7–5 record (5–4 in conference). The Cyclones finished in a four-way tie for third place in the Big 12. They played three ranked FBS teams during the regular season, defeating Texas while losing to Iowa and Oklahoma.

Game summary

Statistics

References

External links
 Game statistics at statbroadcast.com

Camping World Bowl
Cheez-It Bowl
Iowa State Cyclones football bowl games
Notre Dame Fighting Irish football bowl games
Camping World Bowl
Camping World Bowl